Dinner at the Ritz is a 1937 British mystery romance film directed by Harold D. Schuster and starring David Niven, Annabella, and Paul Lukas. It was produced by the British branch of 20th Century Fox, and shot at Denham Studios.

Synopsis
The daughter of a banker is engaged to marry one of her father's colleagues. However, her father inadvertently discovers his soon-to-be son-in-law is in fact one of the men who have misappropriated his bank's funds. While confronting Baron de Beaufort, Mr. Racine is shot; his daughter refuses to believe that his death was a suicide. Traveling in disguise and helped by a fraud investigator, she tracks those among his colleagues who looted his bank.

Cast
Annabella as Ranie Racine
David Niven as	Paul de Brack
Paul Lukas as Baron Philip de Beaufort
Romney Brent as Jimmy Raine
Francis L. Sullivan as	Brogard
Stewart Rome as Racine
Frederick Leister as Tarade
William Dewhurst as Devine
Tyrell Davis as Duval 
Vivienne Chatterton as	Marthe
Ronald Shiner as Sydney
Nora Swinburne as Lady Railton
Raymond Huntley as Gibout
Ralph Truman as Auctioneer
O. B. Clarence as Messenger (uncredited)
Frederick Culley as (uncredited)
Patricia Medina as (uncredited)
Bill Shine as (Minor role, uncredited)

References

External links
 
 
 

1937 films
1930s mystery films
1930s romance films
British black-and-white films
1930s English-language films
Films directed by Harold D. Schuster
Films set in Monaco
British mystery films
British romance films
20th Century Fox films
Films shot at Denham Film Studios
1930s British films